Joseph Mensah (born 29 September 1994) is a Ghanaian professional footballer who plays as a left midfielder.

Club career

AC Horsens
After a successful one week trial, Mensah signed a two-year contract with the Danish club on 1 August 2014. After only two months in the club, Mensah signed a new contract again, this time until the summer 2017. Mensah had a good season for AC Horsens in the Danish 1st Division with 18 games played in the 2014/15 season. After two good seasons, Mensah suffered a broken shin injury, that kept him out for about 5–6 months in October 2016. However, he signed a contract extension just one month after his injury. He went back from the injury at the start of April 2017. Mensah's contract got terminated on 15 December 2017.

References

External links
 
 

1994 births
Living people
Ghanaian footballers
Association football midfielders
Liberty Professionals F.C. players
SK Slavia Prague players
AC Horsens players
Sepsi OSK Sfântu Gheorghe players
İstanbulspor footballers
Bnei Yehuda Tel Aviv F.C. players
FC Politehnica Iași (2010) players
Ghana Premier League players
Czech First League players
Danish Superliga players
Danish 1st Division players
Liga I players
TFF First League players
Israeli Premier League players
Ghanaian expatriate footballers
Ghanaian expatriate sportspeople in the Czech Republic
Expatriate footballers in the Czech Republic
Ghanaian expatriate sportspeople in Denmark
Expatriate men's footballers in Denmark
Ghanaian expatriate sportspeople in Romania
Expatriate footballers in Romania
Ghanaian expatriate sportspeople in Turkey
Expatriate footballers in Turkey
Ghanaian expatriate sportspeople in Israel
Expatriate footballers in Israel